The WDM-7 is a diesel-electric locomotive of Indian Railways. It has been manufactured by Banaras Locomotive Works (BLW), Varanasi. The model name stands for broad gauge (W), diesel (D), mixed traffic (M) engine. Today, these are found exclusively at Chennai Central and nearby area.



These units have been retro-fitted with air brakes, in addition to the original vacuum brakes.

History 
Fifteen of these locomotives (road numbers #11001 to #11015) were built from 1987 to 1989 as a low-powered, “lightweight” version of the original ALCO. Like the WDM-6, maybe IR wanted a lower powered locomotive to handle small rake local and passenger services. However, all sheds declined them and they ended up at Ernakulam where they were used to handle local and shuttle services with good degrees of efficiency. Becoming aware of their abilities, SR moved all the WDM-7s out of Ernakulam to Tondiarpet, where they are housed today. These days, they are seen being used as shunters at Chennai Central or for light passenger haulage. One (#11008) has been modified to run on bio-diesel.

These Co-Co diesel-electric locomotives were designed primarily for branch-line duties (top speed 105 km/h). They have two 3-axle bogies. The power-pack is a 12-cylinder Alco 251B unit. They are a lower-powered variant of the WDM-2 (the latter produces 2600 hp of usable power, as opposed to the WDM-7 which produces 2000 hp). They were formerly housed at Erode and Golden Rock as well. They are reliable and rugged locomotives even though low-powered. They can be easily recognised by the lack of grilles on the short hood; in fact, they look exactly the same as the WDM-2 except for the “clean” short-hood-forward nose without grilles. Two locos currently operate on a mixture of bio-diesel and diesel. As of today, all 15 built are still in service.

Locomotive shed

Former 
 Ernakulam
 Erode
 Golden Rock

See also 
 Indian locomotive class WDM-2 
 List of diesel locomotives of India
 Rail transport in India
 Rail transport in India#History

References

Notes

Bibliography

External links 

 Ministry of Railways (Railway Board)
 [IRFCA] Indian Railways Locomotive Roster Changes

M-7
Banaras Locomotive Works locomotives
Co-Co locomotives
ALCO locomotives
5 ft 6 in gauge locomotives